Yusupha Bobb (born 22 June 1996) is a Gambian professional footballer who plays as a midfielder for the Gambia national team.

Club career
Bobb's career started in The Gambia with local team Banjul Hawks. In 2015, Bobb joined Serie A side Chievo. On 24 July 2015, Bobb completed a loan move to Lega Pro club Cittadella, he subsequently made his Cittadella and professional debut on 2 August in a Coppa Italia match against Potenza; Cittadella won 15–0 as Bobb scored twice. Three matches later, Bobb scored his first goal in professional league football with a strike against Pavia. He suffered a serious leg injury in a match against Cuneo on 17 January 2016 and subsequently did not feature for Cittadella again prior to returning to Chievo at the end of the 2015–16 campaign.

He was named on the Chievo substitutes bench on 13 August 2016 for a cup tie against Virtus Entella. At the end of August, Bobb joined Taranto on loan, again in Lega Pro. His debut for them came on 11 September in a goalless draw versus Siracusa. In total, he played fourteen times for the club. In 2017, Bobb signed for Padova of Lega Pro on loan. He played five times before returning to his parent team. On 12 July, ahead of the 2017–18 season, Bobb joined Reggiana on a temporary basis. He was loaned out for a fifth occasion in July 2018, joining Cuneo. His first goal arrived on 21 October away to Pro Piacenza, as they won 1–0.

On 19 October 2019, having left Chievo, Bobb headed back to Serie C with Lecco.

On 11 February 2021, he signed with Serie C club Livorno. Following Livorno's relegation and exclusion from football, he joined Piacenza following a successful trial.

International career
Bobb has represented The Gambia at U19 and U20 level. He was called up on numerous occasions to the senior squad, including twice being an unused substitute in 2014 FIFA World Cup qualifying games against Morocco and Ivory Coast respectively. In November 2017, Bobb was called up for Gambia's friendly with Morocco. He made his debut in a 2–0 win in Rabat.
He played in the 2021 Africa cup of Nations, his national team's first continental tournament, where they made a sensational quarter-final.

Career statistics

Club
.

International
.

References

External links
 

1996 births
Living people
Sportspeople from Banjul
Gambian footballers
Association football midfielders
Banjul Hawks FC players
A.C. ChievoVerona players
A.S. Cittadella players
Taranto F.C. 1927 players
Calcio Padova players
A.C. Reggiana 1919 players
A.C. Cuneo 1905 players
Calcio Lecco 1912 players
U.S. Livorno 1915 players
Piacenza Calcio 1919 players
GFA League First Division players
Serie C players
The Gambia youth international footballers
The Gambia international footballers
2021 Africa Cup of Nations players
Gambian expatriate footballers
Gambian expatriate sportspeople in Italy
Expatriate footballers in Italy